Julie Marie Funch Østergaard  (born 6 August 1995) is a Danish ice hockey player and member of the Danish national ice hockey team, currently playing with Hvidovre IK Kvinder of the KvindeLigaen.

Funch Østergaard has represented Denmark at eight IIHF Women's World Championships: the Top Division tournament in 2021, the Division I Group A tournaments in 2013, 2014, 2015, 2016, 2017, and 2018, and the Group B tournament in 2012.

References

External links 
 

Living people
1995 births
Sportspeople from Copenhagen
Danish women's ice hockey forwards
Danish ice hockey centres
Ice hockey players at the 2022 Winter Olympics
Olympic ice hockey players of Denmark